Maria Teresa de Almeida Rosa Cárcomo Lobo (Malanje, 18 February 1929 - Rio de Janeiro, 8 December 2018) was a Portuguese politician and jurist and was the first woman to hold office in Portugal. 

She was Undersecretary of State of Social Affairs from 1970 till 1973, and deputy of the Assembleia Nacional under the Portuguese Estado Novo Cárcomo Lobo was a member of the Permanent Council of the Association of Jurists of the Portuguese Language Countries and of the Brazilian Academy of Economic, Political and Social Sciences.

References

1929 births
2018 deaths
20th-century Portuguese lawyers
Portuguese women lawyers
20th-century Portuguese women politicians
Women government ministers of Portugal